The 2015 CAMS Jayco Australian Formula 4 Championship was an Australian motor racing competition for Formula 4 cars. It was the inaugural Australian F4 Championship. It commenced on 10 July at the Townsville Street Circuit and ended on 6 December at the Homebush Street Circuit after seven events comprising three races each.

The championship, which was organised by the Confederation of Australian Motor Sport and certified by the FIA, was won by Jordan Lloyd.

Teams and drivers
The following Australian-registered teams and drivers contested the championship.

All cars comprised a mandatory Mygale M14-F4 chassis powered by a 1.6-litre turbocharged Ford EcoBoost engine.

Race calendar and results
The calendar was published on 1 December 2014. All events were held in Australia and were contested at V8 Supercar events.

Points system
Points were awarded to the top 10 classified finishers in each race. Five points were awarded to the driver with the fastest time in qualifying. One point was awarded for fastest lap.

Championship standings

Notes:
  Randle is listed as scoring 386 points on the official championship points table.
  McGregor is not listed on the official championship points table.

References

External links

Australian F4 Championship seasons
Australian
F4 Championship
Australian Formula 4